Oorvasi S. Amirtharaj is an Indian politician who is a Member of Legislative Assembly of Tamil Nadu. He was elected from Srivaikuntam as an Indian National Congress candidate in 2021.

Electoral performance

References 

Tamil Nadu MLAs 2021–2026
Living people
Year of birth missing (living people)
Tamil Nadu politicians
Indian National Congress politicians from Tamil Nadu